Douglas Township is a township in Jackson County, Kansas, USA.  As of the 2000 census, its population was 2,135.

History
Douglas Township was organized in 1855.

Geography
Douglas Township covers an area of 64.81 square miles (167.86 square kilometers); of this, 0.04 square miles (0.11 square kilometers) or 0.07 percent is water. The streams of Middle Fork Muddy Creek and Spring Creek run through this township.

Cities and towns
 Hoyt

Adjacent townships
 Cedar Township (north)
 Delaware Township, Jefferson County (northeast)
 Rock Creek Township, Jefferson County (east)
 Soldier Township, Shawnee County (south)
 Menoken Township, Shawnee County (southwest)
 Lincoln Township (northwest)
 Washington Township (west)

Cemeteries
The township contains four cemeteries: Hoyt, Hoyt, Mayetta and Steward.

Major highways
 U.S. Route 75

References
 U.S. Board on Geographic Names (GNIS)
 United States Census Bureau cartographic boundary files

External links
 US-Counties.com
 City-Data.com

Townships in Jackson County, Kansas
Townships in Kansas